The 1995 Carlton Football Club season was the Carlton Football Club's 132nd season of competition, and 99th as a member of the Australian Football League.

Carlton won the AFL premiership, defeating  in the Grand Final. It was the club's sixteenth and, as of 2021, most recent premiership. It was a record-breaking season for the club, in which it set a new record by winning twenty matches during the premiership season.

The club also fielded its reserves team in the Victorian State Football League.

Club summary
The 1995 AFL season was the 99th season of the AFL competition since its inception in 1897; and, having competed in every season, it was also the 99th season contested by the Carlton Football Club. As it had been since 1897, the club's home ground was Optus Oval (known historically as Princes Park) in North Carlton. In addition to contesting the VFL premiership, the Carlton senior team contested the 1995 Ansett Australia Cup, which ran during the pre-season. Carlton also fielded a team in the AFL reserves competition (which was administered at this time by the Victorian State Football League).

Carlton's key senior personnel were all unchanged from 1994: John Elliott as club president, David Parkin as senior coach, and Stephen Kernahan as captain. Parkin had been under pressure to keep his job following the club's early exit from the 1994 finals series, and he was signed to a one-year contract for the 1995 season.

Squad and player statistics for 1995
The following are the senior and supplementary squads for the 1995 season. Numbers in parentheses represent senior games played and goals kicked for Carlton in the 1995 AFL premiership season.

Playing list changes
The following summarises player transfers to and from the club between the conclusion of the 1994 season and the conclusion of the 1995 season.

In

Out

Season summary

Pre-season matches
Big Three Challenge Cup
The event was held on Sunday 19 February at Waverley Park, with three half-length matches played. Collingwood won the event, winning both of its games; Carlton finished second.

Ansett Australia Cup
Carlton played two matches in the 1995 Ansett Australia Cup pre-season competition, before being eliminated by St Kilda in the quarter-finals.

Other pre-season matches
Carlton played two other pre-season practice matches against other clubs before the 1995 season.

Home-and-away season
Carlton opened the home-and-away season strongly, winning its first seven games to move to the top of the ladder. However, the club's premiership favouritism was dented by two huge, unexpected losses suffered back-to-back in Rounds 8 and 9: against 11th placed  by 72 points, and against last-placed  by 56 points. In the latter of those matches, St Kilda held Carlton goalless until the 18th minute of the third quarter. Following the losses, Parkin commented that the team had "gone from the best team in the competition to the worst team in two weeks". Carlton dropped to fourth on the ladder after Round 9.

The club returned to form the following week, defeating 10th placed  by 102 points, and did not lose another game for the season. The club clinched the minor premiership in Round 19, and went on to finish four games clear of second-placed Geelong at the top of the ladder.

Carlton's performance through the season exceeded the expectations of most sportswriters. The club had won the minor premiership in 1993 and finished second after the home-and-away season in 1994, but had failed in the finals in both years. The club's star players were all aging – its key position players and leading midfielders, Bradley, Dean, Kernahan, Madden, Spalding and Williams were all older than 30 at the start of the season – and most had expected Carlton's form to drop away. However, the club's performance received a boost from breakout seasons from five of Carlton's developing players: Brown, Christou, Koutoufides, Ratten and Sexton – as well as a strong performance from rookie Scott Camporeale. Additionally, there was no drop-off in form from the club's older stars, with Bradley in particular in career-best form, winning many media awards for his play during the year. Breakout seasons by forward pocket Brad Pearce and pre-season draftee Matt Clape also provided good alternative options in the forward line. The club also notably adopted a then-novel leadership structure which offered the playing group additional autonomy and accountability, allowing the group to set its own goals and propose some of its own tactical changes; Parkin described it as the "least-coached team" he had been involved with in his 34 years of playing and coaching.

Match notes
The Round 3 match against  was transferred from the Western Oval to the Melbourne Cricket Ground.
The Round 5 match against  was played after heavy rain which left sheets of stagnant water centimetres deep on the Melbourne Cricket Ground surface.
The Round 14 match against  was transferred from Optus Oval on Saturday 8 July to the Melbourne Cricket Ground on Sunday 9 July, due to the large crowd expected between the two teams who were at the top of the ladder.

Finals series
Despite finishing four games clear atop the ladder, and entering the finals with a 13-game winning streak, Carlton was not a rampant favourite to win the premiership. Over the previous two seasons, the club had developed a reputation as finals chokers: in 1993, it had been favourite to win the Grand Final, but lost by 44 points against a young Essendon team; then in 1994, it finished second on the ladder, then lost to seventh-placed Melbourne by 27 points and to an injury-depleted Geelong by 33 points to be eliminated in fifth place.

In the qualifying final, Carlton faced eighth-placed . Brisbane had been 14th on the ladder after Round 15, before winning six of its last seven matches reach its first ever finals series – so it was one of the form teams of the competition. The game was closely fought for three quarters, with Brisbane holding a six-point lead late in the third quarter; Carlton then kicked the next six goals of the game, with Anthony Koutoufides kicking the last three of those in quick time from full forward, to open a match-winning five-goal lead. The final margin was 13 points. The win earned Carlton a bye to the preliminary final, which it won against  by 62 points; Carlton had led by only 19 points at three-quarter time, but kicked seven goals to none in the final quarter.

Carlton faced  in the Grand Final. It was Geelong's fourth Grand Final appearance in the past seven years. When the markets opened, Geelong was a slight 8/11 favourite with bookmakers, but Carlton had edged into 8/11 favouritism by the opening bounce. The game itself, however, was a one-sided victory to Carlton. Carlton led by 40 points at half time, and extended the lead to a game-high 84 points midway through the final quarter, before finally winning by 61 points. Greg Williams won the Norm Smith Medal with 31 disposals and five goals as an attacking midfielder; Geelong full forward Gary Ablett, Sr. – who had kicked 122 goals for the year – was held goalless for the first time since late 1992 by Stephen Silvagni.

Ladder

Premiership team
The Carlton premiership twenty-one was as below.

In the lead-up to the match, there was selection speculation over the availability of two players: Scott Camporeale, who had played every game for the season except the preliminary final, which he missed with back injury, but was expected to be available; and Fraser Brown who had suffered an ankle injury during the preliminary final and whose availability was questionable. Brown had multiple treatments in a decompression chamber during Grand Final week to try to aid the recovery of soft tissue in his ankle. Both players were named in the team. Brown's selection on the Thursday was subject to passing a fitness test on the Saturday morning; he passed the test, but was not fully fit and played short of a stride throughout the game.

To make way for Camporeale's return, Troy Bond, who had played fifteen games for the year including both the qualifying and preliminary finals, was omitted. Bond, who was out of contract, left the club immediately, and did not attend the Grand Final.

Another notable inclusion in the premiership team was Matthew Hogg, who had missed almost the entire season with a foot injury. Hogg played only four senior matches for the season: the Round 22 match against , and all three finals matches.

Notable events
Greg Williams racial vilification case
In the Round 21 match against , Greg Williams was reported for racially vilifying indigenous West Coast player Chris Lewis. Williams was reported under a specific new provision in the players' code of conduct which had been introduced in June following a prominent incident between Damien Monkhorst and Michael Long on Anzac Day. Under the rules, the players would undergo private conciliation first, followed by referral to the tribunal if that failed. Williams denied any memory of the vilification, but issued a public apology to Lewis. Lewis was fined $2,000 for making his allegations public before the private conciliation process had taken place.

Greg Williams umpire abuse case
After the Round 22 match against , Greg Williams was suspended for one match for abusing umpire Darren Goldspink. It was the first time since 1987 that an AFL player had been suspended for abusing an umpire, with the charge usually attracting a fine; but Williams was a repeat offender, so the tribunal came down with a heavier penalty.

Leading goalkickers 
Full forward Stephen Kernahan was Carlton's leading goalkicker for the tenth consecutive season, finishing the year with 63 goals from 21 games. Close behind in second place was forward pocket Brad Pearce; at age 23, Pearce had previously played only four AFL games, but he played 23 matches in a breakout season to kick 53 goals. Half-forwards Earl Spalding and Matt Clape both kicked more than 30 goals; and Greg Williams, who was used in a more attacking role in 1995, rather than the pure centreman role he had generally played in the past, was fifth.

Team awards and records

Game records
Round 9 – the loss against  was a rare instance of the bottom team defeating the top team in a premiership match.
Round 10 – Carlton's quarter-time score of 9.3 (57) against  was its highest quarter-time score since 1984.
Round 10 – Carlton's half-time score of 16.6 (102) against  was its highest half-time score since 1982.
Round 10 to Grand Final – Carlton won sixteen games in a row, the longest winning streak inside a single season since Collingwood won eighteen in a row in 1929.
Round 10 to Round 2, 1996 – Carlton won eighteen games in a row, the longest winning streak by any club since 1956.

Season records
Carlton became the first club to win 20 matches in a 22-game home-and-away season. Seven teams had previously finished with a record of 19–3.
The club's average home-and-away attendance of 40,138 was a new record for the club, which stood until the 2008 season.
The club's average home attendance of 40,194 (aided by a third home match at the Melbourne Cricket Ground) was a new record for the club, which stood until the 2007 season.

Premiership records
Carlton won its 16th senior VFL/AFL premiership, moving past  (15) to become the club with the outright most senior premierships VFL/AFL history. Carlton had previously held this record from 1982–1992, and had shared the position with Essendon since 1993.

Individual awards and records

Robert Reynolds Trophy
The Robert Reynolds Trophy for Carlton's senior best and fairest was awarded to Brett Ratten. It was the first of three occasions on which Ratten won the club best and fairest. After having played as a back pocket for the first few years of his career, Ratten had enjoyed a breakout season in 1995 as an in-and-under midfielder, and he led the team in handpasses and tackles for the year. Often celebrated is the fact that Ratten failed to poll a single Brownlow Medal vote for the season, even in the round 17 match against Fitzroy when he had 44 disposals.

All-Australian team
Five Carlton players and the coach were named in the 1995 All-Australian team:
Craig Bradley (rover)
Ang Christou (half-back flank)
Anthony Koutoufides (interchange)
Justin Madden (ruck)
David Parkin (coach)
Stephen Silvagni (full back)

Representative honours
There were two interstate matches played during the season between Rounds 11 and 12: Victoria vs South Australia, and Western Australia vs the Allies. The matches were played under full State of Origin rules. Carlton players and coaches who were selected in these games were:
Craig Bradley – represented South Australia
Ang Christou – represented Victoria
Andrew McKay – represented South Australia
Stephen Silvagni – represented Victoria
No Carlton players were selected for either Western Australia or the Allies.

Other awards
Craig Bradley won The Age Footballer of the Year award.
Craig Bradley was named as the No. 1 player in Herald Sun sportswriter Mike Sheahan's annual post-season Top 50 players.

Player records and milestones
Round 3 – Stephen Kernahan kicked 10.7 (67) against , the highest score of his career.
Round 14 – Justin Madden played his 300th VFL/AFL game.

Reserves
The Carlton reserves team finished eighth out of twelve teams, with a record of 8–14 from 22 games, to miss the final six.

References

Carlton Football Club seasons
1995 in Australian rules football